Samuel Francis (born 8 February 1958) is a Jamaican cricketer. He played in five first-class matches for the Jamaican cricket team in 1977/78.

See also
 List of Jamaican representative cricketers

References

External links
 

1958 births
Living people
Jamaican cricketers
Jamaica cricketers